Juan Guartem was a Spanish renegade pirate who raided Spanish settlements in New Spain during the late 17th century, most notably his raid against Chepo in 1679.

According to Spanish records, Juan Guartem traveled up the Mandinga River with buccaneers Eduardo Blomar and Bartolomé Charpes. Once across the Isthmus of Panama, they arrived at the coastal town of Chepo and then looted the town before burning it in 1679.

Although forces were sent by Spanish by the Viceroy of Panama, they failed to capture them as the buccaneers escaped into the jungle. Despite this, the three were tried in absentia by the Viceroy and were sentenced to death; Guartem and his two partners being hanged in effigy at Santa Fé de Bogotá the following year.

Despite this, Guartem and the others continued to raid settlements throughout the northern and southern coast of Panama.

References
Anderson, Charles Loftus Grant. Old Panama and Castilla Del Oro: A Narrative History of the Discovery, Conquest and Settlement by the Spaniards of Panama, Darien, Veragua, Santo Domingo, Santa Maria, Cartegena, Nicaragua and Peru. Boston: Page Company, 1914.
Scruggs, William Lindsay. The Colombian and Venezuelan Republics: With Notes on Other Parts of Central and South America. Boston: Little, Brown and Company, 1900.

External links
Juan Guartem, Eduardo Blomar and Bartolomé Charpes: Pirates in Panama History

Year of birth missing
Year of death missing
Spanish pirates
17th-century Spanish people